Fatih Kamaçi (born 23 May 1989) is a Dutch professional footballer who plays as an attacking midfielder for Derde Divisie club Dongen.

References

External links
 Voetbal International profile 
 

1989 births
Living people
Dutch people of Turkish descent
Dutch footballers
TOP Oss players
Gümüşhanespor footballers
Kahramanmaraşspor footballers
VV Dongen players
Eerste Divisie players
Derde Divisie players
TFF Second League players
People from Waalwijk
Association football midfielders
Footballers from North Brabant